Earl Grey is a title in the Peerage of the United Kingdom, held consecutively by seven men since 1806.

Earl Grey may also refer to:

Ships
 CCGS Earl Grey, Canadian Coast Guard icebreaker commissioned in 1986
 CGS Earl Grey, Canadian Coast Guard icebreaker commissioned in 1909
 Earl Grey (1835 ship), transported convicts from Great Britain to Australia

Other
 Earl Grey (character), from the television series Scream Queens
 Earl Grey, Saskatchewan, a village in Canada 
 "Earl Grey" (song), by English rock band Basement from the 2011 album I Wish I Could Stay Here
 Earl Grey tea, a blend of tea

See also
 Earl de Grey, an extinct title in the Peerage of the United Kingdom
 Earl of Kent (1465), surnamed Grey
 Earl of Stamford, surnamed Grey
 Lord Grey (disambiguation)
 Lady Grey (disambiguation)